Heatherton  may refer to:

Places
 Heatherton Village, a suburb of Derby, England
 Heatherton, Michigan (also spelled Hetherton), United States
 Heatherton, Newfoundland and Labrador, Canada
 Heatherton, Nova Scotia, Canada
 Heatherton, Victoria, Australia

Other uses
 Heatherton (surname)

See also
 The Joey Heatherton Album